L'Univers was a nineteenth-century French Roman Catholic daily newspaper that took a strongly ultramontane position.  It was edited by Louis Veuillot.  In 1833 it merged with La Tribune Catholique.

References

External links
 Digitized issues of L'Univers from 1833 to 1860 and from 1867 to 1919 in Gallica, the digital library of the BnF.

Defunct newspapers published in France
History of Catholicism in France
Catholic newspapers